Catherine Lim Poh Imm (born 21 March 1942) is a Singaporean fiction author known for writing about Singapore society and of themes of traditional Chinese culture. Hailed as the "doyenne of Singapore writers", Lim has published nine collections of short stories, five novels, two poetry collections, and numerous political commentaries to date. Her social commentary in 1994, titled The PAP and the people - A Great Affective Divide and published in The Straits Times, criticised the ruling political party's agendas.

Career
Lim was born in Kulim (Malaya) and studied in the Convent of the Holy Infant Jesus. Early childhood reading was mainly influenced by British fiction, including Enid Blyton, Richmal Crompton and some comics.

She received her Bachelor of Arts degree from the University of Malaya in 1963, moving to Singapore in 1967. In 1988, she received her PhD in applied linguistics from the National University of Singapore. Lim then attended Columbia University and the University of California, Berkeley as a Fulbright scholar (1990). She also worked as a teacher and later as project director with the Curriculum Development Institute of Singapore and as a specialist lecturer with the Regional English Language Centre, teaching sociolinguistics and literature. In 1992, she left her professional career to become a full-time writer. Lim was subsequently made a Knight of the Order of Arts and Letters (France) in 2003 and an ambassador of the Hans Christian Andersen Foundation (Copenhagen) in 2005. She received an honorary doctorate in literature from Murdoch University.

Lim published her first short story collection called Little Ironies: Stories of Singapore in 1978. A succeeding collection, Or Else, the Lightning God and other Stories, was published in 1980. The short story collection was the first Singapore book to be tested for the Cambridge International Examinations in 1989 and 1990. Another story collection that followed in this tradition was O Singapore!: Stories in Celebration from 1989, but two years earlier she published The Shadow of a Shadow of a Dream, which found Lim experimenting with new techniques and extending her subject range.

Her first novel, The Serpent's Tooth, was published in 1982. Other books that have been published since then include The Bondmaid (1995) and Following the Wrong God Home (2001). The major theme in her stories is the role of women in traditional Chinese society and culture. In 1998 Lim was awarded the Montblanc-NUS Centre for the Arts Literary Award and in 1999 she received the S.E.A. Write Award.

In 2000, Lim worked with the now-defunct web portal Lycos Asia to write an e-novella called Leap of Love. It was sold online (at 19 cents a chapter) before it was published by Horizon Books in 2003. It served as basis for the film The Leap Years by Raintree Pictures in 2008.

Another best-selling novel was The Bondmaid, which sold 75,000 copies.

In 2015, Little Ironies: Stories of Singapore was selected by The Business Times as one of the Top 10 English Singapore books from 1965–2015, alongside titles by Arthur Yap and Daren Shiau. In the same year, The Straits Times''' Akshita Nanda selected Little Ironies: Stories of Singapore as one of 10 classic Singapore books. "Catherine Lim's early short, sharp fiction describes the results of such social engineering", she wrote, "a Singapore growing more cosmopolitan and Singaporeans losing touch with their roots. Little Ironies spotlights ordinary people at their best and worst, such as 'The Taximan's Story', in which a cab driver is happy to make money off sex workers while looking down on them."

 Controversy 
Lim came into conflict with the People's Action Party (PAP) in 1994 when she wrote an article published in The Straits Times (PAP and the People: A Great Affective Divide). From comments made by then Prime Minister Goh Chok Tong and other cabinet ministers, especially George Yeo, this episode gave rise to the political "out of bounds" marker that came to be known as "boh tua boh suay" (literally, "no big, no small" in the Chinese dialect of Hokkien, to mean "no respect for rank and seniority"). Lee Kuan Yew dismissed Lim's views as "the popular theory that the Western press writes about". In his memoirs, Lee is quoted as saying:

Supposing Catherine Lim was writing about me and not the prime minister. She would not dare, right? Because my posture, my response has been such that nobody doubts that if you take me on, I will put on knuckle-dusters and catch you in a cul-de-sac. There is no other way you can govern in a Chinese society.

 Works 
 Novels 
 The Serpent's Tooth (1982, Times Books International) 
 The Bondmaid (1995, C. Lim Pub; 1997, 1998, Orion; 1997, 1998, The Overlook Press; 2011, Marshall Cavendish Editions)   
 The Teardrop Story Woman (1998, Orion; 2011, Marshall Cavendish Editions) 
 Following the Wrong God Home (2001, Orion Publishing; 2001, Allen & Unwin; 2011, Marshall Cavendish Editions)  
 A Leap of Love: A Novella (2003, Horizon Books) 
 The Song of Silver Frond (2003, Orion; 2011, Marshall Cavendish Editions) 
 Miss Seetoh in the World (2011, Marshall Cavendish Editions) 

 Short story collections 
 Little Ironies: Stories of Singapore (1978, Heinemann Asia) 
 Or Else, the Lightning God and Other Stories (1980, Heinemann Asia; 1988, Federal Publications; 2012, Heinemann)   
 They Do Return...But Gently Lead Them Back (1983, Times Books International) 
 The Shadow of a Shadow of a Dream: Love Stories of Singapore (1987, Heinemann Asia; 1999, Horizon Books)  
 O Singapore! Stories in Celebration (1989, Times Books International) 
 Deadline for Love and Other Stories (1992, Heinemann Asia; 1999, Horizon Books) 
 Meet Me on the Queen Elizabeth 2! (1993, Heinemann Asia; 1999, Horizon Books)  
 The Best of Catherine Lim (1993, Heinemann Asia) 
 The Woman's Book of Superlatives (1993, Times Books International) 
 The Howling Silence: tales of the dead and their return (1999, Horizon Books) 
 The Catherine Lim Collection (2009, Marshall Cavendish Editions) 

 Poetry 
 Love's Lonely Impulses (1992, Heinemann Asia) 
 Humoresque (2006, Horizon Books) 

 Non-fiction 
 Unhurried Thoughts At My Funeral (2005, Horizon Books) 
 A Watershed Election: Singapore’s GE 2011 (2011, Marshall Cavendish Editions) 
 Roll Out the Champagne, Singapore!: An Exuberant Celebration of the Nation's 50th Birthday (2014, Marshall Cavendish Editions) 
 An Equal Joy: Reflections on God, Death and Belonging (2017, Marshall Cavendish Editions) 

 Plays 
 Kampong Amber (1994)

 Anthologies 
 Gwee Li Sui, ed. Written Country: The History of Singapore through Literature (2016, Landmark Publications) 

 References 

 Further reading 
 Quayum, Mohammad A., Peninsular Muse: Interviews with modern Malaysian and Singaporean poets, novelists and dramatists'', Peter Lang, 2007,

External links 

 Catherine Lim's blog
 Catherine Lim on Postcolonialweb.org
 Review of "Following the Wrong God Home" in Eclectica Magazine
 "Catherine Lim opens e-book chapter" – ZDNet Asia. 29 November, 2000
 Catherine Lim interview in the Plus section of TODAY. 15 February, 2006
https://eresources.nlb.gov.sg/infopedia/articles/SIP_461_2005-01-17.html

1942 births
Living people
National University of Singapore alumni
S.E.A. Write Award winners
Singaporean atheists
Singaporean people of Chinese descent
Columbia University alumni
Malaysian emigrants to Singapore
People who lost Malaysian citizenship
Naturalised citizens of Singapore
Singaporean women writers
Singaporean poets
Singaporean non-fiction writers
Singaporean novelists
Singaporean women poets
Women novelists
Singaporean women short story writers
20th-century short story writers
21st-century short story writers
21st-century Singaporean women writers
21st-century Singaporean writers
20th-century Singaporean women writers
20th-century Singaporean writers
Fulbright alumni